Najim al-Radwan (22 August 1972 – 15 November 2018) was a Saudi Arabian weightlifter. He competed in the 2004 Summer Olympics.

References

1972 births
2018 deaths
Weightlifters at the 2004 Summer Olympics
Saudi Arabian male weightlifters
Olympic weightlifters of Saudi Arabia
21st-century Saudi Arabian people